Saranon Anuin (born 24 March 1994) is a Thai professional footballer who plays as a goalkeeper for Thai League 1 club Chiangrai United and the Thailand national team.

International career
In 2018 he was called up by Thailand national team for the 2018 AFF Suzuki Cup. 

Saranon was named for the final squad in 2019 AFC Asian Cup.

Honours

Club
Chiangrai United
Thai League 1: 2019
 Thai FA Cup: 2018, 2020–21
 Thai League Cup: 2018
Thailand Champions Cup:  2020

International
Thailand
AFF Championship: 2022

References

External links
 

1994 births
Living people
Saranon Anuin
Saranon Anuin
Association football goalkeepers
Saranon Anuin
Saranon Anuin
Saranon Anuin